The canton of Bellac is an administrative division of the Haute-Vienne department, western France. Its borders were modified at the French canton reorganisation which came into effect in March 2015. Its seat is in Bellac.

It consists of the following communes:
 
Bellac
Berneuil
Blanzac
Blond
Breuilaufa
Le Buis
Chamboret
Cieux
Compreignac
Gajoubert
Montrol-Sénard
Mortemart
Nantiat
Nouic
Peyrat-de-Bellac
Saint-Bonnet-de-Bellac
Saint-Junien-les-Combes
Saint-Martial-sur-Isop
Saint-Pardoux-le-Lac
Thouron
Val-d'Issoire
Vaulry

References

Cantons of Haute-Vienne